China Federation for Defending the Diaoyu Islands is a non-governmental organization which maintains that the Senkaku (Diaoyu) Islands are a part of Chinese territory in the Senkaku Islands dispute. The territorial rights to the islands are disputed between the People's Republic of China, the Republic of China, and Japan, which currently has control over the islands.

In the early morning of March 24, 2004, seven activists from the group landed on the islands, planning to stay for several days.  That afternoon, they were detained by the Japanese coast guard. The incident gave the territorial dispute renewed media attention and worsened Sino-Japanese relations.

See also
2012 China anti-Japanese demonstrations
Action Committee for Defending the Diaoyu Islands
Anti-Japanese sentiment in China

References

External links
Private Group Plans to Lease, Develop Diaoyu Islands in China Internet Information Center.
New Sino-Japanese strain over disputed islands in Asia Times.

China–Japan relations
Political organizations based in China